Park Chun-ran (born 1965) is a South Korean bureaucrat previously served as President Moon Jae-in's first Vice Minister of Education from 2017 to 2018 and his second head of National Human Resource Management Institute from 2019 to 2021. Park is the first woman to ever become the deputy head of the Ministry of Education or its preceding agencies which dates back to 1948. 

Before becoming the Vice Minister of Education in May 2017, she was the deputy Superintendent of Seoul Office of Education from July 2016 and previously North Chungcheong Office of Education from December 2014. 

After passing the state exam in 1989, she dedicated her career in public service - mostly at the Ministry or its preceding agency. In 2005 she became its head of University Affairs Bureau - the youngest to assume this managerial level at the entire South Korean government at the age of 40. 

Park also led Office of General Administration at Kyungpook National University and Gangneung–Wonju National University respectively.

After leaving the public service as the Vice Minister in 2018, she was brought back to fulfill the role of President of National Human Resource Management Institute - a vice-ministerial role emptied by Yang Hyang-ja for her 2020 general election. 

Park holds two degrees in law - a bachelor from Seoul National University and a master's from UC Berkeley School of Law.

References 

Living people
Seoul National University alumni
UC Berkeley School of Law alumni
1965 births
South Korean government officials